Gertrude or Gertrud may refer to:

Places

In space
Gertrude (crater), a crater on Uranus's moon Titania
710 Gertrud, a minor planet

Terrestrial placenames
Gertrude, Arkansas
Gertrude, Washington
Gertrude, West Virginia

People
Gertrude (given name), a given name (including a list of people with the name)
People with Gertrude as the full name:
Blessed Gertrude of Aldenberg (1227–1297), daughter of Saint Elizabeth of Thuringia and abbess near Trier
Gertrude of Austria (1226–1288), Duchess of Austria and Styria
Gertrude of Babenberg (c. 1118–1150), Duchess of Bohemia
Gertrude of Baden (c. 1160–1225), Margravine of Baden
Gertrude of Bavaria (died 1197), daughter of Henry the Lion, Queen consort of Denmark
Gertrude of Brunswick (c. 1060–1117), Margravine of Frisia and Meissen
Gertrude of Comburg (died 1130), Queen consort of Germany
Gertrude of Dagsburg (died 1225), Duchess of Lorraine
Gertrude of Delft (died 1358), Dutch Beguine and mystic
Gertrude of Flanders, Countess of Savoy (1135–1186)
Gertrude of Flanders, Duchess of Lorraine (c. 1070–1117)
Gertrude of Hackeborn (1223–1292), Abbess of Helfta
Saint Gertrude of Hamage (died 649), 7th century saint, founder of the convent Hamage near Douai
Saint Gertrude of Helfta or Gertrude the Great (1256–c. 1302), German Benedictine, mystic, and theologian, Patroness of the West Indies
Gertrude of Hohenberg (c. 1225–1281), Queen consort of Germany
Gertrude of Merania (1185–1213), Queen consort and regent of Hungary
Saint Gertrude of Nivelles (c.626–659), daughter of Pepin I and founder of the Nivelles monastery
Gertrude of Poland ( 1025–1108), Grand Princess Consort of Kiev
Gertrude of Saxony or Gertrude of Holland (ca.1030-1113), wife of Robert I of Flanders, regent of Holland
Gertrude of Sulzbach (c. 1110–1146), Queen consort of Germany
Gertrude of Süpplingenburg (1115–1143), Duchess of Bavaria and Saxony

Art, entertainment, and media
Gertrude (given name), a which includes a list of fictional characters with this given name
Gertrud (film), 1964 Danish film based on Söderberg's play
Gertrud (novel), by Hermann Hesse
Gertrud (play), by Hjalmar Söderberg

Other uses
Gertrude, a 560-ton copper sheathed ship chartered by the New Zealand Company in 1841 
Gertrude (code name), an invasion plan for Turkey by Nazi Germany
Gertrude, an underwater telephone used by submarines for communication
.Gertrude, an Esoteric programming language

See also
Trudy